Thomas Michael Nichols (born December 7, 1960) is an American writer, academic specialist on international affairs, and retired professor at the U.S. Naval War College. His work deals with issues involving Russia, nuclear weapons, and national security affairs.

Early life and education
Born in Holyoke, Massachusetts, Nichols grew up in Chicopee, Massachusetts, where he attended public schools in the 1960s and 1970s. His paternal grandparents were Greek immigrants, and his mother is of Irish descent. He stated in a speech at The Heritage Foundation that he did not come from an educated family, noting that his parents were "both Depression era kids who dropped out of high school".

Nichols was awarded a BA degree in political science from Boston University in 1983, an MA degree in political science from Columbia University in 1984, a certificate from the Harriman Institute of Columbia University in 1985, and a PhD in government from Georgetown University in 1988. His doctoral thesis was The politics of doctrine: Khrushchev, Gorbachev and the Soviet military.

Nichols is a five-time Jeopardy! champion, winning during regular season play in 1994. At this time, players were limited to five wins; Nichols has argued this rule should be reinstated to increase competitive fairness. He later participated in the 1994 Tournament of Champions and the 2005 Ultimate Tournament of Champions, losing in the quarterfinals and the first round, respectively. Nichols has since become a critic of the show, writing that Jeopardy! has "lost the spirit that made it an American institution," and should be discontinued.

Career
Following completion of his doctorate at Georgetown University, in 1989 Nichols received a faculty appointment at Dartmouth College. He remained there until 1997.

In 1997, Nichols became professor of strategy at the U.S. Naval War College, a position he retained until 2008. Subsequently, Nichols was named professor of national security affairs at the war college. He retired in 2022. He also is a senior associate of the Carnegie Council on Ethics and International Affairs New York City.

Concurrent during his tenure at Dartmouth, Nichols served as legislative aide for defense and foreign affairs to U.S. Senator John Heinz (R-Pennsylvania).

In 2005, Nichols was appointed to visiting and adjunct faculty roles at La Salle University and Harvard University, respectively.

In 2008, Nichols was named a fellow at the John F. Kennedy School of Government at Harvard University.

He is a contributing writer at The Atlantic and authors its newsletter, entitled Peacefield.

Awards
Petra T. Shattuck Excellence in Teaching Award from Harvard Extension School (2012)
Navy Meritorious Civilian Service Award.

Politics
Nichols registered with the Republican Party in 1979. He describes himself as a Never Trump conservative. During the 2016 presidential campaign, Nichols argued that conservatives should vote for Hillary Clinton, whom he detested, because Trump was "too mentally unstable" to serve as commander-in-chief.

Nichols continued that type of argument for the 2018 midterm elections and advocated that Republicans could save the party by electing as many Democrats as possible in that election.

Following the confirmation of Brett Kavanaugh to the Supreme Court of the United States, Nichols announced on October 7, 2018, that he would leave the Republican Party to become an independent. He claimed that Senator Susan Collins's "yes" vote on the confirmation convinced him that the Republican Party exists to exercise raw political power. He stated that the Republicans have become a threat to the rule of law and to constitutional norms. Nichols also criticized the Democratic Party for being "torn between totalitarian instincts on one side and complete political malpractice on the other". He said that with the exception of Senators Chris Coons, Sheldon Whitehouse, and Amy Klobuchar, the Democratic party's behavior during the Kavanaugh hearings was “detestable”.

In an opinion column published in 2019, Nichols cited the Mueller Report to argue that Trump failed in his role as a citizen and then as commander-in-chief, by not doing more to prevent and punish the Russian interference in the 2016 U.S. presidential election.

In April 2022, Nichols was quoted regarding the invasion of Ukraine by Russia, stating: "If Putin's goal was to cement his grip on power by making Russia hated for decades to come, well, congratulations, I guess."

Personal life
After his previous marriage ended in divorce, Nichols married his current wife Lynn in 2014. Nichols has one daughter; the family lives in Middletown, Rhode Island. He is a Greek Orthodox Christian.

Publications

Books
The Sacred Cause: Civil-Military Conflict over Soviet National Security, 1917-1992 (1993, Cornell University Press) 
The Russian Presidency: Society and Politics in the Second Russian Republic (1999, Palgrave Macmillan) 
Winning the World: Lessons for America's Future from the Cold War (2002, Praeger) 
Eve of Destruction: The Coming Age of Preventive War (2008, University of Pennsylvania Press) 
Tactical Nuclear Weapons and NATO, (co-editor) (2012, Military Bookshop) 
No Use: Nuclear Weapons and U.S. National Security (2013, University of Pennsylvania Press) 
The Death of Expertise: The Campaign Against Established Knowledge and Why it Matters (2017, Oxford University Press) , a study of why people mistrust established knowledge and how this damages democratic stability.

See also

List of Republicans who opposed the Donald Trump presidential campaign, 2016

References

External links
 

1960 births
20th-century American male writers
20th-century American non-fiction writers
21st-century American male writers
21st-century American non-fiction writers
American male non-fiction writers
American political writers
Boston University alumni
Columbia Graduate School of Arts and Sciences alumni
Dartmouth College faculty
Georgetown University alumni
Georgetown University faculty
Harvard Extension School faculty
Jeopardy! contestants
Living people
Naval War College faculty
People from Chicopee, Massachusetts
Rhode Island Independents
Rhode Island Republicans
The Atlantic (magazine) people
Writers from Massachusetts
Writers from Rhode Island
People from Holyoke, Massachusetts
People from Middletown, Rhode Island
American writers of Greek descent
American writers of Irish descent
Greek Orthodox Christians from the United States